The West Coast is a region in the South Island of New Zealand. It contains numerous rural primary schools and several small town primary and secondary schools. Area schools in isolated areas provide complete education from primary to secondary level. All schools in the region are coeducational.

In New Zealand schools, students begin formal education in Year 1 at the age of five. Year 13 is the final year of secondary education. Years 14 and 15 refer to adult education facilities.

State schools are those fully funded by the government and at which no fees can be charged, although a donation is commonly requested. A state integrated school is a state school with a special character based on a religious or philosophical belief. The state integrated schools on the West Coast are all Catholic schools. A private school charges fees to its students. The only private school in this region is Gloriavale Christian Community School near Haupiri, which is operated by a religious group.

The decile rating indicates the socio-economic group that the school catchment area falls into. A rating of 1 indicates a poor area; a rating of 10 a well-off one. The decile ratings used here come from the Ministry of Education Te Kete Ipurangi website and from the decile change spreadsheet listed in the references. The deciles were last revised using information from the 2006 Census. The roll of each school changes frequently as students start school for the first time, move between schools, and graduate. The rolls given here are those provided by the Ministry of Education, based on figures from June 2011 roll returns. The Ministry of Education institution number, given in the last column, links to the Education Counts page for each school.

Buller District
The Buller District covers the northern part of the West Coast region. The only 2 towns in the district with more than 1000 people are Westport and Reefton

Grey District
The Grey District lies between the Buller and Westland districts. Greymouth and its satellite towns contain the majority of the district's population.

Westland District
The Westland District is the largest district on the West Coast, and the one with the smallest population. Hokitika is the only substantial town, with a population of just over 3,000 people.

Closed schools
 Waimangaroa School, state full primary school at Waimangaroa, closed January 2013 due to declining roll numbers.
 Jacobs River School, state full primary school at Jacobs River, closed January 2013 due to declining roll numbers.

References
General

 

Specific

 
West Coast